Luqa St. Andrew's Football Club are a Maltese football club from the south-western town of Luqa in Malta. Founded in 1934, the club currently competing in the Maltese National Amateur League, becoming champions after winning both championship play-off matches. In seasons 2010–11 and 2016–2017 the team was promoted to the Second Division from the Maltese Third Division. The team is also known by the nickname "Reds".

Current squad

Honours

 Maltese National Amateur League
Winners (1): 2020–21

Club officials
 President: Evan Camilleri
 Vice President: Carmelino Martinelli
 Youth Nursery Chairman: Mark Said
 Secretary: Godfrey Borg
Treasurer: Nathanael Falzon
Assistant Treasurer: Alfred Cauchi

References

External links
Club Profile at soccerway.com
Official Facebook page

 
Football clubs in Malta
Association football clubs established in 1934
1934 establishments in Malta